Emma M. Cramer was a member of the Ohio House of Representatives from Scioto County. She was born in 1859 to Albert C. and Louise (née Crone) Cramer. She dedicated much of her life to the service of Portsmouth, Ohio. Cramer was a teacher at Portsmouth High School until she retired in 1933. During her teaching career, she was also involved in many civic organizations, including the Portsmouth City Council, the Republican Women's Society of Scioto County, and the Portsmouth Board of Education.

References

Republican Party members of the Ohio House of Representatives
Women state legislators in Ohio
Schoolteachers from Ohio
1859 births
1952 deaths
American women educators